The Punta Valgrande is a mountain of the Lepontine Alps, located on the border between Switzerland and Italy. The west side belongs to the Swiss canton of Valais and the east side belongs to the Italian region of Piedmont.

The closest locality is Gondo, on the south side.

References

External links
 Punta Valgrande on Hikr

Mountains of the Alps
Mountains of Switzerland
Mountains of Piedmont
Italy–Switzerland border
International mountains of Europe
Mountains of Valais
Lepontine Alps
Two-thousanders of Switzerland